Anisyl alcohol (4-methoxybenzyl alcohol) is an organic compound with the chemical formula CH3OC6H4CH2OH.  It is a colorless liquid that is used as a fragrance and flavorant.  It occurs naturally but is produced by reduction of anisaldehyde.

See also
 Vanillyl alcohol

References

Primary alcohols
Phenol ethers
Benzyl compounds